Lykov is a Russian male surname, its feminine counterpart is Lykova. It may refer to:

Lykov family of Russian Old Believers
Agafia Lykova (born 1944), Russian Old Believer, member of Lykov family
Maxim Lykov (born 1987), Russian poker player
Oleh Lykov (born 1973), Ukrainian rower
Yuri Lykov (born 1961), Russian football coach and a former player

Russian-language surnames